Collariella is a genus of fungi in the family Chaetomiaceae.

Species 
 Collariella bostrychodes (Zopf) X.Wei Wang & Samson 2016
 Collariella capillicompacta M. Mehrabi-Koushki, Aghyl & M. Esfand. 2019
 Collariella carteri X.Wei Wang, Houbraken & Samson 2016
 Collariella causiiformis (L.M. Ames) X.Wei Wang & Samson 2016
 Collariella gracilis (Udagawa) X.Wei Wang & Samson 2016
 Collariella hilkhuijsenii Crous 2017
 Collariella quadrangulata (Chivers) X.Wei Wang & Samson 2016
 Collariella quadrum Z.F. Zhang, F. Liu & L. Cai 2017
 Collariella robusta (L.M. Ames) X.Wei Wang & Samson 2016
 Collariella virescens (Arx) X.Wei Wang & Samson 2016

Sordariales
Sordariomycetes genera